Andover is a rural locality in the local government area (LGA) of Southern Midlands in the Central LGA region of Tasmania. The 2021 census recorded a population of 39 for Andover.
It consists of mostly farming land and several historic pastoral properties. Andover covers an area of 73.446 square kilometres.

History 
Andover was gazetted as a locality in 1974.

Eastern Marshes Siding Post Office opened in 1888, and was renamed Andover in 1893. It closed in 1966.

It was historically a village on the Little Swan River, in the county of Somerset, Tasmania about 62 km (50 miles) from Hobart. It was named by Lieutenant Francis Tabart in 1831.

Geography
The Little Swanport River rises in the locality and flows through to the south-eastern boundary.

Road infrastructure
Route C310 (Inglewood Road) passes through from west to south-east. Route C307 (Lemont Road) starts at an intersection with C310 and runs east until it exits. Route C309 (Nala Road) starts at an intersection with C310 and runs north and east until it exits.

References

Populated places established in the 19th century
Towns in Tasmania
Localities of Southern Midlands Council